Rendezvous with Rama is a science fiction novel by British writer Arthur C. Clarke first published in 1973. Set in the 2130s, the story involves a  cylindrical alien starship that enters the Solar System. The story is told from the point of view of a group of human explorers who intercept the ship in an attempt to unlock its mysteries. The novel won both the Hugo and Nebula awards upon its release, and is regarded as one of the cornerstones in Clarke's bibliography. The concept was later extended with several sequels, written by Clarke and Gentry Lee.

Plot
After an asteroid falls in Northeast Italy on 11 September 2077, creating a major disaster, the government of Earth sets up the Spaceguard system as an early warning of arrivals from deep space.

The "Rama" of the title is an alien starship weighing at least ten trillion tons, initially mistaken for an asteroid categorised as "31/439". It is detected by astronomers in the year 2131 while it is still outside the orbit of Jupiter. Its speed (100,000 km/h – 62,150 m/h) and the angle of its trajectory clearly indicate it is not on a long orbit around the sun, but is an interstellar object. The astronomers' interest is further piqued when they realise the asteroid has an extremely rapid rotation period of four minutes and is exceptionally large. It is named Rama after the Hindu god, and an uncrewed space probe dubbed Sita is launched from the Mars moon Phobos to intercept and photograph it.

The solar survey vessel Endeavour is sent to study Rama, as it is the only ship close enough to do so in the brief period Rama will spend in the Solar System. Endeavour manages to rendezvous with Rama one month after it first comes to Earth's attention, when the alien ship is already inside Venus's orbit. The crew, led by Commander Bill Norton, enters Rama through a safety system consisting of triple airlocks, and explores the 16-km wide by 50-km long cylindrical world of its interior, but the nature and purpose of the starship and its creators remain enigmatic throughout the book. Rama's inner surfaces hold "cities" of geometric structures that resemble buildings and are separated by streets with shallow trenches. A band of water, dubbed the Cylindrical Sea, stretches around Rama's central circumference. Massive spires, which are theorised to be part of Rama's propulsion system, stand at its "southern" end. They also find that Rama's atmosphere is breathable.

One of the crew members, Jimmy Pak, who has experience with low gravity skybikes, rides a smuggled skybike along Rama's axis to the far end, otherwise inaccessible due to the cylindrical sea and the 500m high cliff on the opposite shore. Once at the massive metal cones on the southern end of Rama, Jimmy detects magnetic and electric fields coming from the cones, which increase, resulting in lightning. Due to his proximity to the spires, the concussion from a discharge damages his skybike causing him to crash on the isolated southern continent.

When Pak wakes up, he sees a crab-like creature picking up his skybike and chopping it into pieces. He cannot decide whether it is a robot or a biological alien, and keeps his distance while radioing for help. As Pak waits, Norton sends a rescue party across the cylindrical sea, using a small, improvised craft, constructed earlier for exploration of the sea's central island. The creature dumps the remains of the skybike into a pit, but ignores Pak himself, who explores the surrounding fields while waiting for the rescue party to arrive. Amongst the strange geometric structures, he sees an alien flower growing through a cracked tile in the otherwise sterile environment, and decides to take it as both a curiosity and for scientific research.

Pak jumps off the 500m cliff, his descent slowed by the low gravity and using his shirt as a drogue parachute, and is quickly rescued by the waiting boat. As they ride back, tidal waves form in the cylindrical sea, created by the movements of Rama itself as it makes course corrections. When the crew arrives at base, they see a variety of odd creatures inspecting their camp. When one is found damaged and apparently lifeless, the team's doctor/biologist Surgeon-Commander Laura Ernst inspects it, and discovers it to be a hybrid biological entity and robot—eventually termed a "biot". It, and by assumption the others, are powered by internal batteries (much like those of terrestrial electric eels) and possess some intelligence. They are believed to be the drones of Rama's still-absent builders.

The members of the Rama Committee and the United Planets, both based on the Moon, have been monitoring events inside Rama and giving feedback. The Hermian colonists have concluded that Rama is a potential threat and send a rocket-mounted nuclear bomb to destroy it should it prove to pose a threat. Lt. Boris Rodrigo takes advantage of the five minute transmission delay and uses a pair of wire cutters to defuse the bomb and its control.

As Rama approaches perihelion, and on their final expedition, the crew decide to visit the city closest to their point of entry, christened "London", and use a laser to cut open one of the "buildings" to see what it houses. They discover transparent pedestals containing holograms of various artefacts, which they theorise are used by the Ramans as templates for creating tools and other objects. One hologram appears to be a uniform with bandoliers, straps and pockets that suggests the size and shape of the Ramans. As the crew photographs some of the holograms, the biots begin returning to the cylindrical sea, where they are recycled by aquatic biots ('sharks') and the six striplights that illuminate Rama's interior start to dim, prompting the explorers to leave Rama and to re-board Endeavour.

With Endeavour a safe distance away, Rama reaches perihelion and utilizes the Sun's gravitational field, and its mysterious "space drive", to perform a slingshot manoeuvre which flings it out of the Solar System and towards an unknown destination in the direction of the Large Magellanic Cloud.

Ending
The book was meant to stand alone, although its final sentence suggests otherwise:

Clarke denied that this sentence was a hint that the story might be continued. In his foreword to the book's sequel, he stated that it was just a good way to end the first book, and that he added it during a final revision.

Reception
John Leonard of The New York Times, while finding Clarke "benignly indifferent to the niceties of characterization," praised the novel for conveying "that chilling touch of the alien, the not-quite-knowable, that distinguishes sci-fi at its most technically imaginative." Other reviewers have also commented on Clarke's lack of character development and overemphasis on realism.

Awards and nominations
The novel was awarded the following soon after publication
Nebula Award for Best Novel in 1973
British Science Fiction Association Award in 1973
Hugo Award for Best Novel in 1974
Jupiter Award for Best Novel in 1974
John W. Campbell Memorial Award in 1974
Locus Award for Best Novel in 1974
Seiun Award for Best Foreign Language Novel in 1980

Design and geography of Rama

The interior of Rama is essentially a large cylindrical landscape, dubbed "The Central Plain" by the crew, 16 kilometres in diameter and nearly 50 long, with artificial gravity provided by its 0.25 rpm spin. It is split into the "northern" and "southern" plains, divided in the middle by a 10-km wide expanse of water the astronauts dub the "Cylindrical Sea". In the center of the Cylindrical Sea is an island of unknown purpose covered in tall, skyscraper-like structures, which the astronauts name "New York" due to an imagined similarity to Manhattan. At each end of the ship are North and South "Poles". The North Pole is effectively the bow and the South Pole the stern, as Rama accelerates in the direction of the north pole and its drive system is at the South Pole.

The North Pole contains Rama's airlocks, and is where the Endeavour lands. The airlocks open into the hub of the massive bowl shaped cap at the North Pole, with three 8-kilometre long stair systems, called Alpha, Beta, and Gamma by the crew, leading to the plain.

The Northern plain contains several small "towns" interconnected by roads, dubbed London, Paris, Peking, Tokyo, Rome, and Moscow. The South Pole has a giant cone-shaped protrusion ("Big Horn") surrounded by six smaller ones ("Little Horns"), which are thought to be part of Rama's reactionless space drive.

Both ends of Rama are lit by giant trenches (three in the northern plain and three in the south), equidistantly placed around the cylinder, effectively functioning as giant strip lighting.

Books in the series
Clarke paired up with Gentry Lee for the remainder of the series. Lee wrote while Clarke read and made editing suggestions. The focus and style of the last three novels are quite different from those of the original with an increased emphasis on characterisation and clearly-portrayed heroes and villains, rather than Clarke's dedicated professionals. These later books did not receive the same critical acclaim and awards as the original.

 Rendezvous with Rama (1973) 
 Rama II (1989) 
 The Garden of Rama (1991) 
 Rama Revealed  (1993) 

Gentry Lee also wrote two further novels set in the same Rama Universe.

Bright Messengers (1995)
Double Full Moon Night (1999)

Adaptations

Video games
A graphic adventure computer game of the same name with a text parser based on the book was made in 1984 by Trillium and ported to other systems such as the Apple II, Commodore 64. Despite its primitive graphics, it had highly detailed descriptions, and it followed the book very closely along with having puzzles to solve during the game.

In Spain there was an official adaptation for the 2nd generation MSX computers called Cita con Rama that took advantage of the MSX's ability to produce (at the time) high-quality graphics. It was adapted from the Clarke novel in 1983 by Ron Martinez, who went on to design the massively multiplayer online game 10Six, also known as Project Visitor.

Sierra Entertainment created Rama in 1996 as a point and click adventure game in the style of Myst. Along with highly detailed graphics, Arthur C. Clarke also appeared in the game as the guide for the player. This game featured characters from the sequel book Rama II.

Radio adaptation

In 2009, BBC Radio 4 produced a two-part radio adaptation of the book as part of a science-fiction season. It was adapted by Mike Walker, and was broadcast on 1 March 2009 (Part 1) and 8 March 2009 (Part 2).

Film
In the early 2000s, actor Morgan Freeman expressed his desire to produce a film based on Rendezvous with Rama. The film has been stuck in "development hell" for many years. In 2003, after initial problems procuring funding, it appeared the project would go into production. The film was to be produced by Freeman's production company, Revelations Entertainment. David Fincher, touted on Revelations' Rama web page as far back as 2001, stated in a late 2007 interview that he was still attached to helm.

By late 2008, David Fincher stated the movie was unlikely to be made. "It looks like it's not going to happen. There's no script and as you know, Morgan Freeman's not in the best of health right now. We've been trying to do it but it's probably not going to happen."

In 2010, Freeman stated in an interview that he was still planning to make the project but that it has been difficult to find the right script. He also stated that it should be made in 3D. In January 2011, Fincher stated in an interview with MTV that he was still planning to make the film after he had completed work on his planned remake of 20,000 Leagues Under the Sea (which was scheduled to begin production in 2012 but has since been scrapped). He also reiterated Freeman's concerns about the difficulty of finding the right script.

In an interview with Neil deGrasse Tyson in February 2012, Freeman indicated an interest in playing the role of Commander Norton for the film, stating that "my fantasy of commanding a starship is commanding Endeavour". Tyson then asked, "So is this a pitch to be ... that person if they ever make that movie?" to which Freeman reaffirmed, "We are going to make that movie." In response to a plea to "make that come out sooner rather than later", Freeman reiterated that difficulty in authoring a high quality script is the primary barrier for the film, stating "... the only task you have that's really really hard in making movies, harder than getting money, is getting a script ... a good script".

In December 2021, it was announced that the film was in development at Alcon Entertainment with Denis Villeneuve set to direct. Morgan Freeman and Lori McCreary are on the production team because their Revelations Entertainment previously owned the rights. Alcon co-CEOs Broderick Johnson and Andrew Kosove will produce.

Non-fictional aspects

Clarke created the space study program which detects Rama, Project Spaceguard, as a method of identifying near-Earth objects on Earth-impact trajectories; in the novel it was initiated in 2077. A real project named Spaceguard was initiated in 1992, named after Clarke's fictional project and "with the permission and encouragement of Clarke". After interest in the dangers of asteroid strikes was heightened by a series of Hollywood disaster films, the United States Congress gave NASA authorisation and funding to support Spaceguard. By 2017, there were a number of different efforts to detect potentially dangerous asteroids.

On 19 October 2017 an incoming interstellar object was discovered by Pan-STARRS, a system similar to Spaceguard. Like Rama, the object had an unusually elongated shape. Before the official Hawaiian name ʻOumuamua was selected by the International Astronomical Union, a popular choice was Rama.

See also

 O'Neill cylinder
 McKendree cylinder
 Generation starship

References

External links 
 
 
 Rendezvous with Rama at Worlds Without End

Rama series
1973 British novels
1973 science fiction novels
Biorobotics in fiction
British science fiction novels
Hard science fiction
Hugo Award for Best Novel-winning works
Novels about impact events
John W. Campbell Award for Best Science Fiction Novel-winning works
Large Magellanic Cloud in fiction
Nebula Award for Best Novel-winning works
Novels about extraterrestrial life
Novels by Arthur C. Clarke
Novels set in the 22nd century
Fiction about the Solar System
Space exploration novels
Fiction about trans-Neptunian objects
Victor Gollancz Ltd books
Fiction about megastructures
Xenoarchaeology in fiction